Lee Yuen Yin (born 16 July 1989) is a Hong Kong female competitive rower.

She qualified to the 2016 Summer Olympics in Rio de Janeiro, and was selected to represent Hong Kong in the women's lightweight double sculls, together with Lee Ka Man.

References

External links

1989 births
Living people
Hong Kong female rowers
Olympic rowers of Hong Kong
Rowers at the 2016 Summer Olympics
Rowers at the 2010 Asian Games
Rowers at the 2014 Asian Games
Rowers at the 2018 Asian Games
Asian Games competitors for Hong Kong